Paki Tuimavave is a Samoan former professional rugby league footballer who played in the 1980s and 1990s.

Background
Also see :Category:Tuimavave family.

He is the brother of fellow internationals Tony and Paddy Tuimavave.

Playing career
Tuimavave played for the Waitakere City Raiders in the 1994 Lion Red Cup and toured New Zealand with Western Samoa in 1994.

In 1995 and 1996 he played for the North Harbour Sea Eagles in the Lion Red Cup, scoring a try in the 1995 grand final. He represented Auckland in the 1997 Super League Challenge Cup. He scored 26 tries over the three seasons of the Lion Red Cup.

Representative career
Tuimavave played at the 1995 World Cup for Western Samoa.

References

External links
Statistics at rugbyleagueproject.org (1995 Western Samoa statistics inadvertently allocated to his brother; Paddy Tuimavave)
Paddy Tuimavave's Statistics at rugbyleagueproject.org (1995 Western Samoa statistics inadvertently allocated from his brother; Paki Tuimavave)
World Cup 1995 details
World Cup 1995 details (archived)

Auckland rugby league team players
Living people
North Harbour rugby league team players
Richmond Bulldogs players
Rugby league fullbacks
Samoa national rugby league team players
Samoan emigrants to New Zealand
Samoan rugby league players
Waitakere rugby league team players
Year of birth missing (living people)
Tuimavave family